Sir Reginald Mitchell Banks, KC (26 August 1880 – 9 July 1940) was a British Conservative politician and County Court judge. He was Member of Parliament for Swindon between 1922–29 and 1931–34.

The son of surgeon Sir William Mitchell Banks, Banks was born in Liverpool. He was educated at Rugby and Christ Church, Oxford, where he was senior classical scholar. He was called to the bar by the Inner Temple in 1905. He took silk in 1923, was Recorder of Wigan from 1928 to 1934, and was elected a bencher of the Inner Temple in 1930.

During the First World War, he enlisted in the 1st/5th Battalion, The East Surrey Regiment, before being commissioned into the Indian Army Reserve and attached to the 1st/5th Gurkha Rifles. He served in India and Mesopotamia, before being appointed as a military censor in the Press Bureau in 1917.

He was elected Conservative Member of Parliament for Swindon in 1922, serving until being defeated by Christopher Addison in 1929. He was elected again for Swindon in 1931, but stepped down upon his appointment as a County Court judge in 1934, and held the office until his death in 1940. He was knighted in 1928.

References

External links 

 

Knights Bachelor
1940 deaths
Conservative Party (UK) MPs for English constituencies
British King's Counsel
British Army personnel of World War I
East Surrey Regiment soldiers
British Indian Army officers
20th-century English judges
People educated at Rugby School
Alumni of Christ Church, Oxford
Members of the Inner Temple
UK MPs 1922–1923
UK MPs 1923–1924
UK MPs 1924–1929
UK MPs 1931–1935
1880 births
Indian Army personnel of World War I
County Court judges (England and Wales)
Lawyers from Liverpool
Military personnel from Liverpool